Greece v United Kingdom (176/1956) was a case before the European Commission of Human Rights in which Greece alleged abuses by the British government in Cyprus.

Sources

1956 in law
European Commission of Human Rights cases